Drymodes is a genus of bird in the family Petroicidae. 
It was traditionally held to have two species, but molecular and behavioural differences led to the split of the New Guinea populations from the northern scrub robin. The paper by Les Christidis and colleagues was published in 2011 and the IOC adopted the split in 2015:

Species
The genus contains the following three species:

References

 Del Hoyo, J.; Elliot, A. & Christie D. (editors). (2007). Handbook of the Birds of the World. Volume 12: Picathartes to Tits and Chickadees. Lynx Edicions.

External links

 
Petroicidae
Bird genera
Taxonomy articles created by Polbot